Joseph Martinez (born 1878, date of death unknown) was an Algerian-French gymnast. He competed in the men's individual all-around event at the 1900 Summer Olympics.

Martinez was the first-ever All-Around Champion in the sport of Artistic Gymnastics at the first-ever World Championships in Antwerp, Belgium, in 1903.  He continued to compete at the next few World Championships winning many more medals for his team and for himself, individually.

References

External links
 

1878 births
Year of death missing
French male artistic gymnasts
Olympic gymnasts of France
Gymnasts at the 1900 Summer Olympics
Sportspeople from Oran
Date of birth missing
Place of death missing
French people in French Algeria